Neotonchidae is a family of nematodes belonging to the order Chromadorida.

Genera:
 Comesa Gerlach, 1956
 Dystomanema Bezerra, Pape, Hauquier, Vanreusel & Ingels, 2013
 Filitonchoides Jensen, 1986
 Filitonchus Platt, 1982
 Gomphionchus Platt, 1982
 Neotonchoides Platt, 1982

References

Nematodes